Absalom Backus Earle (1812–1895), also known as A. B. Earle, was an American Baptist pastor, evangelist and author, well-known for his public meetings in US and Canada. He was born in Charlton, New York, USA in 1812 and later moved to Amsterdam, New York where he pastored a church for 5 years.

Life and Ministry
Earle was converted in 1828 at the age of 16. In 1830, two years after his conversion, he started preaching and studying the Bible. When he was 21 years, A. B. Earle was ordained at Amsterdam, New York, where he preached for 5 years. Following his pastoral work, he became an evangelist for 58 years, visiting every state in the US, three provinces in Canada and the British Isles. He crossed 325,000 miles, preached 19,780 times, and 150,000 persons professed conversions in his meetings in the United States and Canada. He died at his home in Newton, Massachusetts, on March 30, 1895, at 83 years of age.

Works
 Abiding Peace
 Bringing in the Sheaves
 Evidences of Conversion
 Incidents used by Rev. A. B. Earle in his meetings|
 Rest of Faith
 Revival Hymns
 The Human Will
 Two Sermons
 Winning Souls
 Work of an Evangelist: Review of Fifty Years

References

External links
 Deeper experiences of famous Christians by Lawson Gilchrist
 The Charismatic Movement by John Rice

1812 births
1895 deaths
American evangelists
Christian revivalists
19th-century American writers